This is a list of development tools for 32-bit ARM Cortex-M-based microcontrollers, which consists of Cortex-M0, Cortex-M0+, Cortex-M1, Cortex-M3, Cortex-M4, Cortex-M7, Cortex-M23, Cortex-M33 cores.

Development toolchains
IDE, compiler, linker, debugger, flashing (in alphabetical order):
 Ac6 System Workbench for STM32 (based on Eclipse and the GNU GCC toolchain with direct support for all ST-provided evaluation boards, Eval, Discovery and Nucleo, debug with ST-LINK)
 ARM Development Studio 5 by ARM Ltd.
 Atmel Studio by Atmel (based on Visual Studio and GNU GCC Toolchain)
 Code Composer Studio by Texas Instruments
 CoIDE by CooCox (note - website dead since 2018)
 Crossware Development Suite for ARM by Crossware
 CrossWorks for ARM by Rowley
 Dave by Infineon. For XMC processors only. Includes project wizard, detailed register decoding and a code library still under development.
 DRT by SOMNIUM Technologies. Based on GCC toolchain and proprietary linker technology. Available as a plugin for Atmel Studio and an Eclipse-based IDE.
 Eclipse as IDE, with GNU Tools as compiler/linker, e.g. aided with GNU ARM Eclipse plug-ins
 EmBitz (formerly Em::Blocks) – free, fast (non-eclipse) IDE for ST-LINK (live data updates), OpenOCD, including GNU Tools for ARM and project wizards for ST, Atmel, EnergyMicro etc.
 Embeetle IDE - free, fast (non-eclipse) IDE. Works both on Linux and Windows.
 emIDE by emide – free Visual Studio Style IDE including GNU Tools for ARM
 GNU ARM Eclipse – A family of Eclipse CDT extensions and tools for GNU ARM development 
 GNU Tools (aka GCC) for ARM Embedded Processors by ARM Ltd – free GCC for bare metal
 IAR Embedded Workbench for ARM by IAR
 ICC by ImageCraft
 Keil MDK-ARM by Keil
 LPCXpresso by NXP (formerly Red Suite by Code Red Technologies)
 MikroC by mikroe – mikroC
 MULTI by Green Hills Software, for all Arm 7, 9, Cortex-M, Cortex-R, Cortex-A
 Ride and RKit for ARM by Raisonance
 SEGGER Embedded Studio for ARM by SEGGER.
 SEGGER Ozone by SEGGER.
STM32CubeIDE by ST - Combines STCubeMX with TrueSTUDIO into a single Eclipse style package
 Sourcery CodeBench by Mentor Graphics
 TASKING VX-Toolset by Altium
 TrueSTUDIO by Atollic
 Visual Studio by Microsoft as IDE, with GNU Tools as compiler/linker – e.g. supported by VisualGDB
 VXM Design's Buildroot toolchain for Cortex. It integrates GNU toolchain, Nuttx, filesystem and debugger/flasher in one build.
 winIDEA/winIDEAOpen by iSYSTEM
 YAGARTO – free GCC (no longer supported)
 Code::Blocks (EPS edition) (debug with ST-LINK no GDB and no OpenOCD required)

IDE for Arduino ARM boards
 Arduino – IDE for Atmel SAM3X (Arduino Due)
 Energia – Arduino IDE for Texas Instruments Tiva and CC3200

Notes:

Debugging tools

JTAG and/or SWD debug interface host adapters (in alphabetical order):
 Black Magic Probe by 1BitSquared.
 CMSIS-DAP by mbed.
 Crossconnect by Rowley Associates.
 DSTREAM by ARM Ltd.
 Green Hills Probe and SuperTrace Probe.
 iTAG by iSYSTEM.
 I-jet by IAR.
 Jaguar by Crossware.
 J-Link by SEGGER Supports JTAG and SWD. Supports ARM7, ARM9, ARM11, Cortex-A, Cortex-M, Cortex-R, Renesas RX, Microchip PIC32.  Eclipse plug-in available.  Supports GDB, RDI, Ozone debuggers.
 J-Trace by SEGGER. Supports JTAG, SWD, and ETM trace on Cortex-M.
 JTAGjet by Signum.
 LPC-LINK by Embedded Artists (for NXP)  This is only embedded on NXP LPCXpresso development boards.
 LPC-LINK 2 by NXP.  This device can be reconfigured to support 3 different protocols: J-Link by SEGGER, CMSIS-DAP by ARM, Redlink by Code Red.
 Multilink debug probes, Cyclone in-system programming/debugging interfaces, and a GDB Server plug-in for Eclipse-based ARM IDEs by PEmicro.
 OpenOCD open source GDB server supports a variety of JTAG probes OpenOCD Eclipse plug-in available in GNU ARM Eclipse Plug-ins.
 AK-OPENJTAG by Artekit (Open JTAG-compatible).
 AK-LINK by Artekit.
 PEEDI by RONETIX 
 RLink by Raisonance.
 ST-LINK/V2 by STMicroelectronics The ST-LINK/V2 debugger embedded on STM32 Nucleo and Discovery development boards can be converted to SEGGER J-Link protocol.
 TRACE32 Debugger and ETM/ITM Trace by Lauterbach.
 ULINK by Keil.

Debugging tools and/or debugging plug-ins  (in alphabetical order):
 GNU ARM Eclipse J-Link Debugging plug-in.
 GNU ARM Eclipse OpenOCD Debugging plug-in.
Memfault Error Analysis for post mortem debugging
 Percepio Tracealyzer, RTOS trace visualizer (with Eclipse plugin).
 SEGGER SystemView, RTOS trace visualizer.

Real-time operating systems

Commonly referred to as RTOS:

C/C++ software libraries
The following are free C/C++ libraries:

 ARM Cortex libraries:
 Cortex Microcontroller Software Interface Standard (CMSIS)
 CMSIS++: a proposal for the next generation CMSIS, written in C++
 libopencm3 (formerly called libopenstm32)
 libmaple for STM32F1 chips
 LPCOpen for NXP LPC chips
 Alternate C standard libraries:
 Bionic libc, dietlibc, EGLIBC, glibc, klibc, musl, Newlib, uClibc
 FAT file system libraries:
 EFSL, FatFs, Petit FatFs
 Fixed-point math libraries:
 libfixmath, fixedptc, FPMLib
 Encryption libraries:
 Comparison of TLS implementations
 wolfSSL

Non-C/C++ computer languages and software libraries

See also
 List of free and open-source software packages
 Comparison of real-time operating systems
 List of terminal emulators

References

Further reading

External links

Cortex-M development tools
Programming tools
Lists of software